The women's 400 metres hurdles event at the 2001 European Athletics U23 Championships was held in Amsterdam, Netherlands, at Olympisch Stadion on 13 and 14 July.

Medalists

Results

Final
14 July

Heats
13 July
Qualified: first 3 in each heat and 2 best to the Final

Heat 1

Heat 2

Participation
According to an unofficial count, 14 athletes from 11 countries participated in the event.

 (1)
 (3)
 (1)
 (1)
 (1)
 (1)
 (1)
 (2)
 (1)
 (1)
 (1)

References

400 metres hurdles
400 metres hurdles at the European Athletics U23 Championships